Roger Hansson may refer to:

Roger Hansson (ice hockey) (born 1967), Swedish ice hockey player
Roger Hansson (sport shooter) (born 1970), Swedish sport shooter

See also
Roger Hanson (1827–1863), general in the Confederate States Army
Roger L. Hanson (1925–2005), American businessman and politician